Song is the third and final studio album by Lullaby for the Working Class. It was released in 1999 on Bar/None Records.

Critical reception
Trouser Press wrote: "Both playful indie-poppers and studious chamber ensemble, Lullaby maps a course through ten songs, establishing and contrasting melodies, building acoustic walls of sound more akin to My Bloody Valentine than Mazzy Star." Exclaim! thought that Lullaby for the Working Class "have fully descended into over-orchestrated meaninglessness."

Track listing
 "Expand, Contract"  
 "Inherent Song"   
 "Asleep on the Subway"  
 "Seizures"  
 "Non Serviam"  
 "Sketchings on a Bar Room Napkin"  
 "Kitchen Song"  
 "Ghosts"  
 "Still Life"

Personnel
Lullaby for the Working Class
Matt Silcock – accordion
Katie Swoboda, Liz Schueller – cello
Eric Medley – clarinet
A.J. Mogis – bass, piano
Shane Aspegren – drums, percussion
Mike Mogis – guitar, pedal steel, hammered dulcimer, banjo, vibraphone
Erin Wright, Tiffany Kowalski – violin
Ted Stevens – vocals, guitar
Amoree Lovell – backing vocals

Additional personnel
Mike Mogis and A.J. Mogis - production, recording, mixing
Doug Van Sloun – mastering
A.J. Mogis, Jeff Yarbrough, Pat Oakes, Shane Aspegren, Todd Baechle – photography

References

1999 albums
Lullaby for the Working Class albums
Bar/None Records albums